The 1957–58 Hellenic Football League season was the fifth in the history of the Hellenic Football League, a football competition in England.

Premier Division

The Premier Division featured 15 clubs which competed in the division last season, along with one new club:
Luton Town Colts, promoted from Division One

Also, Bletchley & Wipac changed name to Bletchley Town.

League table

Division One

The Division One featured 8 clubs which competed in the division last season, along with 6 new clubs:
Aston Clinton
Hanwell Corinthians
Hazells
Henley Town
Pressed Steel Reserves
Stanwell District

League table

References

External links
 Hellenic Football League

1957-58
H